The enzyme cyanide hydratase catalyzes the chemical reaction

formamide  cyanide + H2O

This enzyme belongs to the family of lyases, specifically the hydro-lyases, which cleave carbon-oxygen bonds.  The systematic name of this enzyme class is formamide hydro-lyase (cyanide-forming). Other names in common use include formamide dehydratase, and formamide hydro-lyase.  This enzyme participates in cyanoamino acid metabolism.

References

 

EC 4.2.1
Enzymes of unknown structure